Navarrese nationalism is a political and social movement that claims Navarre to be a nation.

History 
Navarrese nationalism was born out of independentist approaches to the reality of the region, different from the proposals of traditional Basque nationalist voices. It wants to establish a sovereign state in Navarre, and they see a historical precedent in the medieval Kingdom of Navarre; or at least achieving a higher status for Navarre inside a hypothetically independent Basque Country, as they consider the ancient kingdom to be the founder of current Basque institutions.

Even if it is a minoritary movement, it has trends within it. Some of their members are near the abertzale left, with a similar ideology to that of Basque separatism; others are moderates, who want a more controlled and steady concession of sovereignty to Navarre; and there is also a sector identified with the political right. The conservatives, after the promulgation of the Agreed Law (1841) and the dictatorship of Francisco Franco (1936-1978), are now defenders of foralism, rather than nationalism, existing in the Basque Country a sector close to the ideals of the Basque Nationalist Party.

A 2005 survey found that only 36.8% of Navarrese residents reported a "predominant feeling of Navarrese national identity". In 2019, another survey showed an increase to 52.16% in that same question.

References 

Politics of Navarre
Basque nationalism
Stateless nationalism in Europe
Nationalism in France
Nationalism in Spain